Disney monorail may refer to:

 Disney Resort Line, at the Tokyo Disney Resort in Japan
 Disneyland Monorail System, at the Disneyland Resort in California, United States
 Walt Disney World Monorail System, at the Walt Disney World Resort in Florida, United States

See also 
 Rail transport in Walt Disney Parks and Resorts